Soko Shimabuku ( Shimabuku Sōkō; 5 October 1926 – 9 December 2022) was a Japanese politician. A member of the Okinawa Social Mass Party, he served in the House of Councillors from 1992 to 2004.

Shimabuku died on 9 December 2022, at the age of 96.

References

1926 births
2022 deaths
Japanese politicians
Members of the House of Councillors (Japan)
Members of the Okinawa Prefectural Assembly
People from Naha